The following lists events that happened during 1905 in New Zealand.

Incumbents

Regal and viceregal
Head of State – Edward VII
Governor – The Lord Plunket GCMG KCVO

Government
The Liberal Party are re-elected and formed the 16th New Zealand Parliament.
Speaker of the House – Arthur Guinness (Liberal)
Prime Minister – Richard Seddon
Minister of Finance – Richard Seddon
Chief Justice – Sir Robert Stout

Parliamentary opposition
 Leader of the Opposition – William Massey, (Independent).

Main centre leaders
Municipal elections are held on 27 April:
Mayor of Auckland – Edwin Mitchelson then Arthur Myers
Mayor of Wellington – Thomas Hislop
Mayor of Christchurch – Charles Gray
Mayor of Dunedin – Thomas Christie – then Joseph Braithwaite

Events 
The Marlborough Herald begins publication. The Herald continues until 1911. The Marlborough Express stops publishing The Marlborough Times, which started in 1874.

Arts and literature

See 1905 in art, 1905 in literature

Music

See: 1905 in music

Film

See: :Category:1905 film awards, 1905 in film, List of New Zealand feature films, Cinema of New Zealand, :Category:1905 films

Sport

Association football
 The first overseas tour by a New Zealand representative team takes place, to Australia.
 10 June vs Wellington in Wellington (pre-tour warm-up)
 17 June, Sydney: Lost 2–3 vs Metropolitan Association
 21 June, Sydney: Won 8–3 vs Wednesday Association
 24 June, Sydney: Won 6–4 vs New South Wales
 28 June, Sydney: Lost 2–3 vs Navy
 1 July, Sydney: Lost 0–2 vs New South Wales
 5 July, Newcastle: Won 5–4 vs Northern Districts
 8 July, Newcastle: Won 1–0 vs Northern Districts
 12 July, Sydney: Won 6–2 vs Granville
 15 July, Wollongong: Drew 3–3 vs South Coast
 19 July, Sydney: Won 5–0 vs Metropolitan Association
 22 July, Sydney: Drew 1–1 vs New South Wales
This is the last NZ representative team until 1922.

Boxing

National amateur champions
Heavyweight – W. Robertson (Ashburton)
Middleweight – A. Leckie (Dunedin)
Lightweight – G. Williams (Palmerston North)
Featherweight – J. Morris (Dunedin)
Bantamweight – E. Baird (Christchurch)

Chess
The 18th National Chess championship is held in Oamaru. The champion is A.W.O. Davies

Golf
 The 13th National Amateur Championships are held in Auckland 
 Men: Arthur Duncan (Wellington) – 4th title
 Women: Miss A. Stephenson
 Women's golf, previously organised by the Men's association, comes under the auspices of the British Ladies Golf Union.

Horse racing

Harness racing
 New Zealand Trotting Cup: Birchmark 
 Auckland Trotting Cup: Le Rosier

Thoroughbred racing

Rugby
 Ranfurly Shield – Wellington successfully defend the shield against Wairarapa (3–3) and Hawkes Bay (11–3) before losing to Auckland (6–10).

Soccer
Provincial league champions:
 Auckland: Auckland Corinthians
 Canterbury: Christchurch Celtic
 Otago: Kaitangata FC
 Southland: Nightcaps
 Taranaki: Waitara
 Wellington: Diamond Wellington

Births 
 10 January: R. A. K. Mason, poet.
 25 February: Iriaka Rātana, politician. 
 29 March: Dan Bryant, schoolteacher and mountaineer  
 5 April: Guy Powles, diplomat and ombudsman.
 25 June: Ian Cromb, cricketer. 
 28 June: Norman Shelton, politician.
 9 July: John Guthrie, journalist and novelist
 3 September: John Mills, cricketer.
 29 October: John (Jack) Lamason, cricketer.
 10 December: Neil Watson, politician.

Deaths

 6 January: Bendix Hallenstein, merchant.
 14 March: George Fisher, politician.
 22 April: Mary Gabriel Gill, Catholic prioress
 6 June: Marion Hatton, suffragist
 27 June: Te Keepa Te Rangi-pūawhe, Māori tribal leader, soldier and entrepreneur
 20 October: John Thomas Peacock, businessman and politician
 18 November: Te Whiti o Rongomai, Māori leader, pacifist.

See also
History of New Zealand
List of years in New Zealand
Military history of New Zealand
Timeline of New Zealand history
Timeline of New Zealand's links with Antarctica
Timeline of the New Zealand environment

References

External links